Chaos from a Distance is the sixth album by Swedish heavy metal band Syron Vanes.

Track listing 
Chaos from a Distance

Personnel

 Anders Hahne — Guitar
 Rimbert Vahlstroem — Guitar/Lead vocals
 Mats Bergentz — Drums
 Anders Sellborn — Bass

References

External links
 

2016 albums
Syron Vanes albums